An election for President of Israel was held in the Knesset on 19 November 1951 following the 1951 Knesset elections and the formation of the third government (at the time, the length of the president's term was linked to that of the Knesset). Despite his poor health, Weizmann stood again, and there were no opposing candidates. Although Weizmann was the only person to stand, a vote was still held. The result was 85 votes for, 11 against and three blank ballots. 21 MKs did not vote.

He was sworn in for his second term at his home in Rehovot on 25 November.

Weizmann died a year later, and an early election was held to choose the country's second president.

Results

References

External links
Previous Presidential Elections Knesset website 

President
Presidential elections in Israel
Single-candidate elections
Israel